Celestino Corbacho Chaves (Valverde de Leganés, Badajoz, 14 November 1949) is a Spanish politician, who was Member of Catalan Parliament and Minister of Labour and Immigrations in José Luis Rodríguez Zapatero cabinet between 2008 and 2010.

He was the mayor of L'Hospitalet de Llobregat from 1994 till 2008, and Vice President and then President of the Diputación de Barcelona. He was a member of the Socialists' Party of Catalonia. After 2019 local elections, he is member of the Barcelona city council for Ciudadanos party.

Honours

National honours 
  Knight Grand Cross of the Order of Charles III (05/11/2010).

References

External links
 Biography at the Spanish Government website
 Biography at the Labour and Immigration website

Living people
1949 births
Mayors of places in Catalonia
Members of the Parliament of Catalonia
Socialists' Party of Catalonia politicians
People from Badajoz
Labor ministers
Immigration ministers
Government ministers of Spain
Municipal councillors in the province of Barcelona
Members of the 5th Parliament of Catalonia
Barcelona municipal councillors (2019–2023)